Sumitani is a surname. Notable people with the surname include:
, Japanese baseball player
, Japanese comedian and wrestler
, Japanese swordsmith
, Japanese television announcer

Japanese-language surnames